At World's Edge is the ninth album by jazz keyboardist Philippe Saisse. The 2009 release was Saisse's first on Koch Records. It was produced by Saisse and Roy Hendrickson and was nominated for the 2010 Grammy Award for Best Contemporary Jazz Album.

Overview

Philippe Saisse dedicated At World's Edge to his late father Maurice Saisse. This album has African and Latin influences.

The album was nominated for the 2010 Grammy Award for Best Contemporary Jazz Album but lost to the Joe Zawinul album 75. This was Saisse's first Grammy nomination. The other nominees were Urbanus by Stefon Harris, Sounding Point by Julian Lage, and Big Neighborhood by Mike Stern.

Recording
Work on the album began in Saisse's Scarsdale, New York basement studio, but he had to relocate to Los Angeles after a flood destroyed the studio. The album's core musicians, drummer Simon Phillips, bassist Pino Palladino, and guitarist Jeff Golub, recorded with Saisse in Los Angeles, but not all of the album was recorded on site. The guest musicians recorded their parts where ever they were, then sent them to Saisse who produced the pieces together. The work was then sent to Tokyo where engineer Goh Hotoda completed the mixing.

Selected tracks
Saisse's mid-recording forced cross-country move was the inspiration for much of the album. "Billy's Blues", which features Jason Golley on both trumpet and flugelhorn, was inspired by Saisse's friend Bill Howell. Saisse stayed with Howell prior to his move west, the location of Howell's home was the inspiration for the track "Topanga Moon Dance". The album opens with "From Nowhere to Now Here", the piece tells the story of his journey west. The track "Assante Sana" exemplifies Saisse's world view of music. This Latin flavored piece feature the vocals of Angélique Kidjo from Benin, Africa.

Critical reception

Jonathan Widran of Allmusic called At World's Edge "one of the most exciting and explosive contemporary jazz sets of 2009". Randall Parrish called the album "a highly entertaining and engaging work" and closed his review with "[o]nly a true accomplished master such as Philippe Saisse could nimbly pull this expression of contemporary jazz together so marvelously."

Track listing
"From Nowhere to Now Here (Intro)" (Philippe Saisse) 1:16
"From Nowhere to Now Here" (Saisse) 4:11
"The Rover" (Saisse) 3:59
"Billy's Blues" (Saisse) 4:21
"At World's Edge" (Saisse) 4:12
"Monday Afternoon" (Saisse) 5:31
"Assante Sana" (Angélique Kidjo, Saisse) 3:45
"Roppongi Blues" (Saisse) 6:29
"Through Tainted Glass" (Saisse) 3:41
"Topanga Moon Dance" (Saisse) 6:25
"Junto" (Saisse) 2:40
"At World's Edge" [Vocal Version] (David Rice, Saisse) 4:12

Personnel

Philippe Saisse – keyboards, piano, producer
Simon Phillips – drums, Audio engineer, mixing
Pino Palladino – bass
Jeff Golub – guitar, engineer

Guest musicians
Jeff Beal – flugelhorn, trumpet, engineer
Michael Davis – trombone
Marc Antoine – acoustic guitar
Kirk Whalum – tenor saxophone, engineer
Lenny Castro – percussion
Angélique Kidjo – vocals
Annas Allaf – guitar, oud, engineer
Jason C. Golley – trumpet, flugelhorn
David Finck – acoustic bass, engineer, audio production
Jasmine Roy – vocals
Scooter Warner – drums, engineer

Production
Roy Hendrickson – producer, engineer
Goh Hotoda – engineer, mixing, audio production
Ramon Hervey II – executive producer
Francois Boutault – engineer
Javier García – engineer
Ronald Jenkins – engineer
Daniel Meron – engineer
Doug Schwartz – mastering
Andy Snitzer – engineer
Jake Wherry – engineer
Christian "Wicked" Wicht – engineer
Erik Zobler – engineer
Alice Butts – art direction, design
Sunny Bak – photography

References

2009 albums
Philippe Saisse albums
E1 Music albums